Vasconcelos (also Vasconcellos) is a Portuguese surname. Today it can be found in Portugal, Brazil, and elsewhere in the Portuguese-speaking world.

People
Aires de Ornelas e Vasconcelos (1837–1880), Portuguese Roman Catholic Archbishop of Goa, India, in the 19th century.
Ana Vasconcelos (born 1981), Brazilian water polo player.
António-Pedro Vasconcelos (born 1939), Portuguese film director.
Augusto de Vasconcelos (1867–1951), Portuguese surgeon, politician and diplomat.
Carlos Carmelo Vasconcellos Motta (1890–1982), Brazilian cardinal.
Carolina Michaëlis de Vasconcellos (1851–1925), Portuguese philologist.
Doroteo Vasconcelos (1803–1883), President of El Salvador in the 19th century.
Fernanda Vasconcellos (born 1984), a Brazilian movie, theater and television actress.
Fernando De Almeida Vasconcellos (1919–1996), Brazilian chess master.
Gabriel Monteiro Vasconcelos (born 1996), Brazilian footballer
Gabriel Vasconcelos Ferreira (born 1992), Brazilian footballer
Héctor Vasconcelos, Mexican diplomat
John Vasconcellos (born 1932), American politician.
José Leite de Vasconcelos Cardoso Pereira de Melo (1858–1941), Portuguese linguist, philologist and ethnographer.
José Maria Botelho de Vasconcelos, Angolan politician.
José Mauro de Vasconcelos (1920–1984), Brazilian writer.
José Vasconcelos (1882–1959), Mexican writer, philosopher and politician.
Josefina de Vasconcellos (1904–2005), English sculptor.
Júlia Vasconcelos (born 1992), Brazilian taekwondo competitor.
Luís de Vasconcelos e Sousa, 3rd Count of Castelo Melhor (1636–1720), Portuguese politician and prime minister.
Lucile Vasconcellos Langhanke, known as Mary Astor (1906–1987), American actress.
Luis Mendez de Vasconcellos (c.1542-1623), Portuguese Grand Master of the Knights Hospitaller.
Marco Vasconcelos (born 1971), Portuguese badminton player.
Maria de Vasconcelos (born 1970), Portuguese psychiatrist, singer and songwriter
Mário Cesariny de Vasconcelos (1923–2006), Portuguese surrealist poet.
Marta Teresa Smith de Vasconcellos Suplicy (born 1945), Brazilian politician and psychologist.
Martha Vasconcellos (born c.1948), Brazilian model and Miss Universe 1968.
Miguel de Vasconcelos (c.1590-1640), Prime Minister of Portugal in the 17th century.
Naná Vasconcelos (1944-2016), Brazilian percussionist.
Pedro Martins, Lord of the Tower of Vasconcelos, 12th-century Portuguese nobleman, son of Martim Moniz and the first to use the name Vasconcelos.
Pedro Vasconcellos (born 1974), Brazilian television actor.
Wanda Ribeiro de Vasconcelos, known as Lio (born 1962), Belgian singer and actress

Other 
 Alfredo Vasconcelos, city in Minas Gerais, Brazil.
 Diogo de Vasconcelos, city in Minas Gerais, Brazil.
 Countess de Vasconcellos, fictional characters of the video game Broken Sword: The Shadow of the Templars.
 Eduardo Vasconcelos Stadium, stadium in Oaxaca, Mexico.
 Ferraz de Vasconcelos, suburban municipality in São Paulo, Brazil.
 Estádio Dr. João Cláudio Vasconcelos Machado, multi-use stadium in Natal, Rio Grande do Norte, Brazil.
 José Vasconcelos Library, in Mexico City, Mexico.
 Senador Vasconcelos, neighbourhood in Rio de Janeiro, Brazil.

References

External links 
 Origin of the Vasconcelos surname in a Portuguese genealogical site
 The Surname "VASCONCELOS"

Portuguese-language surnames
Toponymic surnames